The Eastern Continental Trail (ECT) is a network of hiking trails in the United States and Canada, reaching from Key West, Florida to Belle Isle, Newfoundland and Labrador.

Description 
The trail system was named by long-distance hiker M. J. Eberhart (trail name: Nimblewill Nomad). The first person to complete the ECT from Key West to Cap Gaspé, Quebec, was John Brinda in 1997. 

From south to north, the route strings together the Florida Keys Overseas Heritage Trail (a rail trail that is partially complete as of early 2022), the Florida Trail, a road walk through southern Alabama, the Pinhoti National Recreation Trail, and part of the Benton MacKaye Trail, to reach the southern terminus of the Appalachian Trail at Springer Mountain, Georgia. The ECT includes the entire Appalachian Trail to Mount Katahdin, Maine, then continues on the International Appalachian Trail through Maine, New Brunswick, and Quebec. The hiking trail ends at the Gulf of St. Lawrence; the hiker can then travel to Newfoundland by other means and complete the next section of the ECT across that island. After another water gap, the ECT reaches its symbolic end at Belle Isle off the northern end of Newfoundland's Great Northern Peninsula.

Components
From south to north, these are the established trails that have been incorporated into the ECT:
Florida Keys Overseas Heritage Trail (under development)
Florida Trail
Pinhoti Trail
Benton MacKaye Trail
Appalachian Trail
International Appalachian Trail

References

Hiking trails in Alabama
Hiking trails in Connecticut
Hiking trails in Florida
Hiking trails in Georgia (U.S. state)
Hiking trails in Maine
Hiking trails in Maryland
Hiking trails in Massachusetts
Hiking trails in New Hampshire
Hiking trails in New Jersey
Hiking trails in New York (state)
Hiking trails in Newfoundland and Labrador
Hiking trails in North Carolina
Hiking trails in Pennsylvania
Hiking trails in Tennessee
Hiking trails in Vermont
Hiking trails in Virginia
Hiking trails in West Virginia
Long-distance trails in the United States